Alfred Ernest Briggs (4 February 1888 – 18 March 1950) was a Scottish professional footballer who played in the Scottish League for Heart of Midlothian as a wing half. He later scouted for Partick Thistle.

Career 
Briggs began his career with junior club Clydebank Juniors. After being capped by the Scotland junior team in 1912, he was signed by Heart of Midlothian manager John McCartney. Briggs made 70 appearances for the club between 1912 and 1917 and was forced to retire due to wounds sustained during the First World War. He later returned to play in Peter Nellies' testimonial match in April 1921.

Personal life 
After the outbreak of the First World War in August 1914, Briggs enlisted as a corporal in McCrae's Battalion of the Royal Scots. He was badly wounded near La Boisselle on the first day of the Somme, being "hit by four machine gun bullets; one in his leg, another in his left foot and through his arm, another in his right ankle, coming out above the knee and another winging his forehead, knocking him out". He sought refuge in a shell hole and was returned to an advanced dressing station near Bécourt, where he was expected to die, but made a recovery before being returned to Britain.

Prior to becoming a professional footballer, Briggs worked as a machine builder for the Singer Corporation in Clydebank. He later returned to work after the war as a boilermaker. At the time of his death in 1950, Briggs still had two German bullets lodged in his back.

Honours 
Heart of Midlothian
 Rosebery Charity Cup: 1912–13

Career statistics

References 

Scottish footballers
Scottish Football League players
Heart of Midlothian F.C. players
Footballers from Glasgow
Association football wing halves
Clydebank Juniors F.C. players
1888 births
Boilermakers
Royal Scots soldiers
McCrae's Battalion
Partick Thistle F.C. non-playing staff
1950 deaths
British Army personnel of World War I
Scotland junior international footballers
Scottish Junior Football Association players
British shooting survivors